Hank Jacob Lammens (born February 21, 1966) is a Canadian former professional ice hockey player.  He was drafted 160th overall by the New York Islanders in the 1985 NHL Entry Draft and played 27 regular season games for the Ottawa Senators during the 1993–94 NHL season.  In addition to his hockey career Lammens was an internationally accomplished sailer, competing for Canada in the 1992 Barcelona Olympics.  He is a two time world champion in the finn class. He was also the captain of the Canadian National Team.

Playing career
In 27 games with the NHL's Ottawa Senators, Lammens managed one goal and two assists and collected 22 penalty minutes. Prior to his professional career, Lammens played for St. Lawrence University, where he served as co-captain during his senior year.

Career statistics

Regular season and playoffs

Post hockey
Lammens is currently an Executive Director in trading for the investment bank of UBS Securities in New York City.

Awards and honors

References

External links
 

1966 births
Living people
Canadian ice hockey defencemen
Capital District Islanders players
Ice hockey people from Ontario
Kansas City Blades players
New York Islanders draft picks
Ottawa Senators players
Sportspeople from Brockville
Prince Edward Island Senators players
Sailors at the 1992 Summer Olympics – Finn
St. Lawrence Saints men's ice hockey players
Springfield Indians players
Olympic sailors of Canada
AHCA Division I men's ice hockey All-Americans